Eide is a municipality in Møre og Romsdal county, Norway.

Eide or EIDE may also refer to:

Places

Norway
 Eide, Askøy, a village in Askøy municipality, Hordaland county
 Eide, Aust-Agder, a former municipality now part of Grimstad municipality in Aust-Agder county
 Eide, Bø, a village in Bø municipality, Nordland county
 Eide, Granvin, a village in Granvin municipality, Hordaland county
 Eide, Hordaland, a village in Odda municipality, Hordaland county
 Eide, Møre og Romsdal, a village in Eide municipality, Møre og Romsdal county
 , a village in Lund, Norway, Rogaland county
 Eide Church, a church in Eide municipality, Møre og Romsdal county
 Eide Church (Aust-Agder), a church in Grimstad municipality, Aust-Agder county

Organisations
 Eide Bailly LLP, a US accounting and business advisory firm
 Eide Marine Services, a Norwegian shipping and maritime company

Other uses
 Eide (surname)
 Enhanced IDE, now also known as Parallel ATA

See also
 Eid (disambiguation)
 Eid Church (disambiguation)
 Eidet (disambiguation)